Found in the table below are fish found in Missouri separated by the Family that they are in. The list is not complete as there are over 200 species of fish found in Missouri.

References

Missouri
.Missouri